Mudgee  is a town in the Central West of New South Wales, Australia. As at June 2021 its population was 12,563. The district lies across the edge of the geological structure known as the Sydney Basin.

History

Wiradjuri people 
The Mudgee and Dabee clans of the Wiradjuri people lived at and around the site of what is now the town of Mudgee on the Cudgegong River. Some cultural and tool-making sites of these Aboriginal people remain, including the Hands on the Rocks, The Drip and Babyfoot Cave sites.

Significance of local names 
Many place-names in the region are derived from the original Wiradjuri language, including Mudgee itself, which was named by the Wiradjuri clan who lived there. There are various translations as to what Mudgee means including "resting place", "contented", "nest in the hills" as well as "friend or mate" which the latter coincides with the Wiradjuri word "mudyi". The correct pronunciation has also been recorded as either Moudgee, Moothi or Mougee. Nearby places include Lue (Loowee, 'a chain of waterholes'); Gulgong ('a gully'); Wollar ('a rock water hole'); Menah ('flat country'); Eurunderee ('a local tree'); Guntawang ('a peaceful place'), Cooyal ('dry country'); Wilbertree ('a long switch'); Gooree ('native chasing live animal'); Burrendong ('darker than usual'). The Aboriginal name of the Rylstone area was Combamolang.

Early British colonisation (1821 to 1850)

James Blackman, leading an small expedition in the latter half of 1821, was the first British colonist to enter the Mudgee district. Not long after, Lieutenant William Lawson who was then commandant of Bathurst, made several further expeditions to Mudgee. Both Blackman and Lawson found the site to be an Aboriginal settlement or bimmel inhabited by around 100 people who called the area Mudgee or Mujjee.

In February 1822, George and Henry Cox, sons of William Cox, followed the trails set up by Blackman and Lawson with 500 head of livestock, and established a grazing property at Menah, 3 kilometres north of the current town. The Coxes were soon in conflict with the Mudgee clan who drove away their workers and livestock. George Cox gathered some men at Bathurst and returned to Menah where a two hour fight later ensued, resulting in six Mudgee people being killed and one of Cox's employees being speared to death.

The violence in the region worsened in June 1824, when Theophilus Chamberlain, who was the Coxes' superintendent of their Mudgee property holdings, led a number of punitive expeditions against the local Aboriginal people. A skirmish at Guntawang to the north of Mudgee resulted in some settlers being killed, with around 70 or more Aboriginal people dying in follow up raids. Martial law was declared by Governor Thomas Brisbane in August 1824, leading to further killings of the Wiradjuri people in the Mudgee area. Descendants and workers of the Coxes later described this period as one where "an immense number of natives, men, women and children were slaughtered" and "the bodies of the blacks were piled together and burnt...like old tar barrels". The violence forced the Coxes to abandon Guntawang, and relieving Chamberlain of his duties, they shifted their enterprise to nearby Dabee.

The Cox family remained prominent landholders around Mudgee for many decades, owning the Dabee, Menah and Burrundulla properties. William Lawson and his descendants also continued to be leading pastoralists in the region, holding estates such as Putta Bucca and Havilah.

The site of the Mudgee township was surveyed in 1837 and the first land sales occurred in August 1838. It has been incorrectly claimed that Robert Hoddle designed the village. Although Hoddle was the first surveyor in the region, marking out the boundaries of Putta Bucca and Bombira, by the time the village was gazetted, he had already left the district to become leader of the Port Phillip Survey. John Blackman built a slab hut, the first dwelling in Mudgee and its general store.

By 1841 there were 36 dwellings, three hotels, a hospital, a post office, two stores and an Anglican church. St John's Church of England was consecrated on 6 May 1841. The police station moved from Menah in the mid-1840s and an Anglican school was established in that decade.

1850 to present

In 1851 the population of Mudgee was 200. This skyrocketed with the discovery of gold by Edward Hargraves in nearby Hargraves, leading to a gold rush. While no gold was found in Mudgee itself, the town is central to the goldfields of Gulgong, Hill End and Windeyer, and grew rapidly as a result.

Mudgee was declared as a municipality in 1860 making it the second oldest municipality west of the Great Dividing Range with a population of 1500 in 1861. A public school was built in the 1850s together with the present Anglican, Catholic Methodist and Presbyterian churches. A new police station, courthouse, Mechanics' Institute and a town hall were built in the 1860s. There were four coach factories operating in Mudgee to cater for the demand of the nearby goldfields. The National Trust of Australia has a number of these buildings registered including the Mudgee Museum (formerly the Colonial Inn), the Catholic presbytery, the court house, the police station and the Anglican Church. On 1 June 1861 the Electric Telegraph system arrived and was opened for messages to be transmitted and received at the Telegraph office.

One gold miner attracted to the Mudgee district was Niels Peter Larsen, who married Louisa Albury in Mudgee in 1866. They were the parents of leading Australian poet Henry Lawson in Grenfell in 1867 and changed their names to Peter and Louisa Lawson. By the birth of their third child, they moved to a selection at Pipeclay (now Eurunderee) 8 km north of Mudgee.  The site is now a rest stop with a plaque.

Louisa Lawson's vigorous lobbying led to the establishment of the slab-and-bark Eurunderee Public School in 1876 with Henry Lawson first attending aged nine. He would later write about the school in his poem, The Old Bark School. Lawson later attended St. Matthews Central School, Mudgee before progressively worsening deafness led to him leaving school at 14. He lived in the region until age 15 and many of his stories were written about the district.

Dubbed the "Mudgee diamond", it was the largest found to that date in Australia, however commercial quantities were not found and companies founded to exploit the discoveries were wound up a few years later.

As the gold petered out in the latter half of the 19th century, Mudgee was sustained by both its wool industry and a nascent wine industry founded by a German immigrant, Adam Roth, in the 1850s. The opening of the railway extension from Rylstone to Mudgee occurred on 10 September 1884.

The railway boosted the town's agriculture. The extension between Rylstone and Mudgee closed on 2 March 1992. This same section re-opened eight years later, on 2 September 2000 and closed again in 2007.  The Wallaby Track Drive Tour visits various sites associated with Lawson including the old Eurundee Public School, the Henry Lawson memorial, the Budgee Budgee Inn, Sapling Gully, Golden Gully and the Albury Pub which was owned by Lawson's grandfather.

In 1890 a local newspaper was founded with the title the Mudgee Guardian and North-Western Representative. Its title changed in 1963 to the Mudgee Guardian and Gulgong Advertiser and is currently published twice a week.

Mudgee's Glen Willow Regional Sports Stadium hosted the 2012 City vs Country Origin rugby league match with an attendance of 8,621, and the 2017 match with an attendance of 8,322. The St. George Dragons regularly host home matches there.

Additionally, in the A-League, the Western Sydney based Western Sydney Wanderers have chosen to take their Community Round match to Mudgee's Glen Willow Regional Sports Stadium, as part of their new Regional Strategy,

In 2014, the local council found itself involved in a statewide corruption investigation when officers of the Independent Commission Against Corruption (New South Wales) raided the local council's offices.

Economy

Mudgee has developed as a wine producing region, it has manufacturing and repair industries. It is also heavily dependent on several major mines in the surrounding area and fly-in fly-out (FIFO) miners who live in the town but work elsewhere.

Other rural produce includes cattle, sheep, wheat, alfalfa, olives, fruit, tomatoes, sweetcorn, honey, alpacas and dairy products. These, however, do not play as large a role as mining.

The Ulan coal mines are in the district and it also produces marble, pottery clays, shale and dolomite. These mines have further potential to expand in the region, however they attract environmental protests.

Tourism is also a growing industry based mostly on the wineries and, as of 2020, escaping the restrictive life in Sydney.  Property prices have surged due to the local airport and the fact that it's only a one hour flight to Sydney.

A laboratory was established in 1987 to test meat for pesticide residues. 

Local real estate, petrol and living costs skyrocketed since 2010 when the mining boom began to peak. This has rolled onto the local population, who have since had increased difficulty in living in the town.

A new hospital was completed in 2020.

Climate
Mudgee has a humid subtropical climate (Cfa), with semi-arid (Bsk) characteristics. Summers are hot with the occasional thunderstorm. Rainfall is moderate and falls fairly evenly all year round, with a slight peak in summer. Extreme temperatures have ranged from 43.9 °C (111.02 °F) to –8.3 °C (17.1 °F). The highest monthly rainfall ever recorded was 303.2 mm (11.9 in) of rain in March 1926. Mudgee gets 113.0 clear days, annually.

Heritage buildings
Mudgee has a number of heritage-listed sites, including:
5-7 Church Street: Regent Theatre
 13 Church Street: St Mary's Roman Catholic Church
 64 Market Street: Mudgee Town Hall
 80 Market Street: Mudgee Post Office
 111 Lester's Lane: Binnawee Homestead
 Wallerawang-Gwabegar railway: Mudgee railway station

Churches
 St John's Anglican Church
 St Mary's Catholic Church
 St Paul's Presbyterian Church
 Mudgee Uniting Church
 Frontline Assemblies of God
 Mudgee Baptist Church
 Salvation Army
 Seventh Day Adventist Church

Schools and colleges
 Cudgegong Valley Public School
 Mudgee High School
 Mudgee Public School
 St Matthews Catholic School
 Mudgee College (TAFE)

Gallery

Notable people
 Natarsha Belling –  national newsreader for Channel 10
 Felicity Brown – milliner
 Kathleen Mary Burrow - physiotherapist, businesswoman and Catholic lay leader
 Kim Currie – Chef and owner of hatted Zin House restaurant, Winner of NSW Rural Woman of the Year 2009
 Ivan Dougherty, Australian army officer, who attended Mudgee High School in his youth
 Jamie Fitzgerald – former professional rugby league footballer who played 71 First Grade NRL games
 Darrell Hair – international cricket umpire
 Lisa Keightley – cricketer, first woman to score a century at Lord's in England
 Henry Lawson – one of Australia's most recognised poets and short story writers. Lived in Mudgee for 16 years during childhood after his birth in Grenfell.
 Louisa Lawson – mother of Henry Lawson and prolific activist
 David Lowe – Winemaker and owner Lowe Wines, President NSW Wine Industry Association, Vice President Australian Winemakers Federation
 The Massey family of organists — born in the town and returned frequently
 Scott McGregor – Australian actor, TV presenter and railway historian
 Ted Noffs –  Methodist minister and founder of the Wayside Chapel in Kings Cross 1964
 James Stanton - Olympic water polo player for Australia.
 Ken Sutcliffe –  television personality, sports reader for Channel Nine
 Dennis Talbot –  professional boxer who represented Australia in the 1972 Olympics in Munich
 Gil Wahlquist - pioneer organic winemaker and owner of Botobolar Vineyard

Groups
 Brothers3 – X-Factor contestants, 2014

See also
 Mudgee Airport

References

Further reading
 John Broadley, Historic Houses of Mudgee , Mudgee: J. Broadley, 2011.
 Memories of Mudgee: A Photographic Glimpse of Bygone Days, Mudgee, N.S.W.: Mudgee Historical Society, Mudgee, 2018.
 Mudgee: A Nest in the Hills, Mudgee, N.S.W.: Mudgee Historical Society, Mudgee, 1981. Foreword by Gil Wahlquist.

External links

 
 
 
 

Towns in New South Wales
Towns in the Central West (New South Wales)
Central Tablelands